is a passenger railway station located in the town of  Mugi, Kaifu District, Tokushima Prefecture, Japan. It is operated by JR Shikoku and has the station number "M24".

Lines

Layout
Mugi Station consists of an island platform serving two tracks. As the station was until 1973 the southern terminus of the Mugi line, numerous passing loops and sidings branch off from the main tracks. The station building houses a waiting room and a JR ticket window (without a Midori no Madoguchi facility). Access to the island platform is by means of a level crossing with ramps.

Platforms

Adjacent stations

History
On 1 April 1987, with the privatization of Japanese National Railways (JNR), the successor of JGR, control of the station passed to JR Shikoku.

Passenger statistics
In fiscal 2019, the station was used by an average of 276 passengers daily

Surrounding area
Mugi Town Hall
Tokushima Prefectural Kaifu Hospital

See also
 List of Railway Stations in Japan

References

External links

  

Railway stations in Tokushima Prefecture
Railway stations in Japan opened in 1942
Mugi, Tokushima